Fritz Suhren (10 June 1908 – 12 June 1950) was a German SS officer and Nazi concentration camp commandant.

Early years
Suhren joined the Nazi Party in 1928 and the Sturmabteilung at the same time. He moved over to the SS in October 1931, initially as a volunteer before going full-time in 1934.

SS service

Trained by the Wehrmacht under SS supervision he was nevertheless not used as a soldier and instead was stationed at Sachsenhausen concentration camp in 1941. By 1942 he was Lagerführer (deputy commandant) at the camp and in May of that year ordered camp Lagerältester Harry Naujoks to hang a prisoner who had been earmarked for execution. Naujoks refused to perform the deed. While Naujoks was able to survive the  insubordination, Suhren insisted that he stand beside the prisoner on the gallows (which had been fitted with a winch in order to prolong the execution) and forced a young inmate to perform the hanging.

Ravensbrück
He was later commandant of the women's camp at Ravensbrück concentration camp. His policy upon taking command in 1942 was to exterminate the prisoners through working them as hard as possible while feeding them the least amount of food he could.

As commandant at Ravensbrück, Suhren had to provide inmates to Dr. Karl Gebhardt for experimentation. Suhren initially objected to this, mainly because most of the inmates at the camp were political prisoners, and he complained to the SS-Reichssicherheitshauptamt about the practice. However the SS command overruled Suhren's doubts and he was forced to apologise to Gebhardt and supply him with the prisoners he demanded. Suhren later said he witnessed experiments that included exposing women to high levels of X-rays in order to accomplish sterilisation.

Near the end of World War II,  and Benoit Musy approached Suhren to ask him to allow a convoy of women to leave the camp and go into the custody of the Scandinavian Red Cross. Suhren refused the request as it was against superior orders although eventually Göring got the backing of Rudolf Brandt and Suhren was forced to yield.

Surrender and execution
With the Allies just a few miles from the camp Suhren took Odette Sansom, an inmate at Ravensbruck whom he believed to be Winston Churchill's niece due in part to her using the assumed surname of Churchill in the camp, and drove with her to the United States base, hoping that her presence would save him. Sansom had in fact been instructed to adopt the false name and to encourage the presumption of her relationship to the British Prime Minister as she was a spy in the camp and the British felt that if the Germans thought she was Churchill's relative they would want to keep her alive as a possible bargaining tool. Suhren was arrested and detained by the British.

In 1946, Suhren and another man, escaped prison and fled to Bavaria. As a result, they did not attend the Hamburg Ravensbrück trials in 1947. However, in 1949, the two men were recaptured by U.S. soldiers, who extradited them to the French occupation zone. Suhren and Pflaum were both put on trial by a French military court. The trial and appeal took place from February to May 1950. The jury was composed of representatives from the French, Dutch and Luxembourg governments, presided by the chief justice officer of the French zone Several dozen former prisoners were subpoenaed. Suhren and Pflaum were found guilty of war crimes and crimes against humanity, sentenced to death, and executed on 12 June 1950.

References

1908 births
1950 deaths
People from Varel
Nazi Party politicians
Prisoners and detainees of the United States military
Sturmabteilung personnel
SS-Sturmbannführer
Holocaust perpetrators in Germany
Sachsenhausen concentration camp personnel
Ravensbrück concentration camp personnel
Executed people from Lower Saxony
Escapees from British military detention
People from Oldenburg (state)
German people convicted of crimes against humanity
Nazis convicted of war crimes
People executed for crimes against humanity
Executed Nazi concentration camp commandants
Nazis executed by France
People executed by the French Fourth Republic
Executed mass murderers